Jalan Slim (Perak state route A121) is a major road in Perak, Malaysia. The road used to be Federal Road 1.

List of junctions

Slim